The Golghar or Gol Ghar (गोलघर), ("Round House") is a large granary located to the west of the Gandhi Maidan in Patna, capital of Bihar state, India.

History

According to a contemporary inscription at its base, the Golghar in Patna was intended to be just the first of a series of huge grain stores. In the end, however, no others were ever built. The granary was "part of a general plan … for the perpetual prevention of famine in these provinces". 

The beehive - shaped structure was designed by John Garstin of the Bengal Engineers, part of the East India Company's Bengal Army. Its construction was completed on 20 July 1786.

A drive to improve the appearance of the structure was begun in 2002.

Architecture

Built in the Stupa architecture, the building has a height of 29 m. It is pillar-less  with a wall of thickness of 3.6 m at the base. One can climb to the top of the Golghar via its 145-step spiral stairway. The spiral staircase was designed to facilitate the passage of the workers who loaded and unloaded the grain in the granary, who had to carry grain-bags up one flight, deliver their load through a hole at the top, and descend the other stairs.

The top of the Golghar presents a panoramic view of the city and the Ganges.

Golghar has never been filled to its maximum capacity and there are no plans to do so. Some have claimed that the reason for this is a flaw whereby the doors are designed to open inwards; thus, if it is filled to its maximum capacity, then the doors will not open. However, visitors have found that the doors open outwards. Presently renovation of this historical monument is underway.

In popular culture
Golghar was shown in 2019 Hindi film India's Most Wanted.

Gallery

See also
 Sabhyata Dwar 
 Samrat Ashok International Convention Centre 
 Buddha Smriti Park 
 Bihar Museum 
 List of tallest domes

References

External links

History of Bihar
Industrial buildings completed in 1786
Granaries
Tourist attractions in Patna
Buildings and structures in Patna
Economic history of India
1786 establishments in India